Eastern Wyoming College is a community college in Torrington, Wyoming. Founded in 1968, the college also has outreach centers serving Platte, Niobrara, Converse, Weston and Crook counties. Additionally it has a satellite campus at Douglas, WY.

References

External links
 Official website

1948 establishments in Wyoming
Community colleges in Wyoming
Education in Goshen County, Wyoming
Educational institutions established in 1948
NJCAA athletics
Torrington, Wyoming